Stella & Steve is the second extended play by New Zealand singer Benee, released on 15 November 2019 by Republic Records.

It was supported by three singles; "Find an Island", "Monsta", and "Supalonely", featuring Gus Dapperton, which the latter went viral on social networking service TikTok in 2020. Commercially, Stella & Steve peaked at number 19 on the New Zealand Albums Chart and the ARIA Albums Chart, number 91 on the Canadian Albums Chart, number 138 on the US Billboard 200, and number 150 on the French Albums Chart.

Background
Detailing the inspiration behind the EP title, Bennett said: "I am Stella and my car is called Steve". Her car Steve, featured on the cover, is a Honda Integra DC2, which also serves as the namesake for the upcoming track Green Honda.

Promotion
The lead single, "Find an Island", was released on 11 October 2019.

The second single, "Monsta", was released on 1 November 2019.

The EP's third and final single, "Supalonely", featuring Gus Dapperton, was released on 6 December 2019.

Critical reception
Gab Ginsberg from Billboard described the EP as "a tight handful of R&B and electronic-tinged pop tracks that showcase where she is here and now" and "serving as a more chill companion to the bubbly Fire on Marzz EP."

Nathan Gunn of Tone Deaf called the EP "Benee's most emotional and well-constructed work, which becomes especially apparent in latter tracks like 'Drifting' and 'Blu'."

Track listing

Personnel
Adapted from the Fire on Marzz / Stella & Steve compilation album's liner notes.

Musicians
 Stella Rose Bennett – writing, vocals 
 
Other musicians
 Josh Fountain – writing 
 Djeisan Suskov – writing 
 Brendan Patrick Rice – writing, vocals 
 Jenna Andrews – writing 
 Jason Schoushkoff – writing 
 Damin McCabe – writing

Technical
 Josh Fountain – production 
 Gus Dapperton – production 
 Spike Stent – mixing 
 Randy Merrill – mastering

Charts

Release history

References

Notes

External links
 

2019 EPs
Benee EPs
Albums produced by Josh Fountain
Republic Records EPs